

The Lammer Geyer Jupiter is a South African four-seat cabin monoplane designed by Lammer Geyer Aviation for sale as a kit for amateur construction.

Design and development
Design on the Jupiter started in 1996 and the prototype, registered ZU-CNH first flew on 1 December 2002. The Jupiter is an all-composite low-wing cantilever monoplane with a fixed tricycle landing gear.

The prototype is powered by a  Continental IO-360 flat-six engine with a three-bladed tractor propeller. The cabin has room for four seated side-by-side in two rows.

Specifications (prototype)

References

Notes

Bibliography

2000s South African civil utility aircraft
Homebuilt aircraft
Single-engined tractor aircraft
Low-wing aircraft
Jupiter
Aircraft first flown in 2002